Norman Steinberg (born June 6, 1939) is an American director, producer and screenwriter. 

Steinberg was a lawyer before starting writing. He wrote several projects with former dentist Alan Uger before the pair were hired by Mel Brooks as writers on his 1974 film Blazing Saddles. He co-scripted for the 1984 film Johnny Dangerously along with Harry Colomby, Jeff Harris and Bernie Kukoff.

Selected filmography 
 Blazing Saddles (1974)
 Yes, Giorgio (1982)
 My Favorite Year (1982)
 Johnny Dangerously (1984)
 Wise Guys (1986)
 Funny About Love (1990)

References

External links 

1939 births
Living people
People from Brooklyn
Television producers from New York (state)
Screenwriters from New York (state)
American male screenwriters
American television producers
American television writers
American male television writers
20th-century American screenwriters
American television directors